Kopriva is a village in the Municipality of Sežana in the Littoral region of Slovenia.

Church

The parish church in the settlement is dedicated to the Prophet Elijah and belongs to the Diocese of  Koper.

Notable people
Notable people that were born or lived in Kopriva include:
 Josip Križaj (1911–1948), military pilot
 Branka Jurca (1914–1999), author

References

External links
Kopriva on Geopedia

Populated places in the Municipality of Sežana